Tsubasa: Reservoir Chronicle, known in Japan as , is a Japanese anime television series based on the manga series of the same name created by Clamp. The plot follows how Sakura, the princess of the Kingdom of Clow, loses all her memories and how Syaoran, a young archaeologist who is her childhood friend, goes on arduous adventures to save her, with two other companions. The Dimensional Witch Yūko Ichihara instructs him to go with two people, Kurogane and Fai D. Flowright. They search for Sakura's memories, which were scattered in various worlds in the form of angelic-like feathers, as retrieving them will help save her very being.

It was written by Hiroyuki Kawasaki and directed by Kōichi Mashimo, with Hiroshi Morioka joining on as co-director for the second season. The music for the series was composed by Yuki Kajiura. The second season was broadcast in Japan on NHK E from April 29 to November 4, 2006. Two pieces of theme music are used for the second season of the anime series. "It's" performed by Kinya Kotani is the opening theme.  performed by Maaya Sakamoto is the ending theme.

Its episodes were collected in seven DVD between Its episodes were collected in seven DVD between August 25, 2006 and February 23, 2007 in Japan. Funimation released the DVDs in the United States between August 19, 2008 and December 29, 2009. A DVD box was released on January 19, 2010. Madman Entertainment released it in Australia between November 12, 2008 and June 24, 2009.
	


Episode list

Home media release
Japanese

United States

Australia

References

Episodes
2006 Japanese television seasons